Shekie Kongo (born 13 June 1949) is a Malawian former boxer.

Shekie competed in the light flyweight event at the 1972 Summer Olympics in Munich. Standing at under five feet tall, he was the smallest man in the boxing tournament and a favourite with the crowd. Kongo was given a bye in the first round, but was defeated in round two by his Ethiopian opponent Chanyalev Haile.

References

Malawian male boxers
1949 births
Living people
Light-flyweight boxers
Olympic boxers of Malawi
Boxers at the 1972 Summer Olympics
Commonwealth Games competitors for Malawi
Boxers at the 1970 British Commonwealth Games